Pat and Margaret is a British television film written by comedian Victoria Wood. The story follows sisters Margaret, a cook, and Pat, a successful actress in the United States, after they are reunited on a television programme after spending 27 years apart. It stars Wood and her frequent comedy partner Julie Walters in the title roles, and features other past collaborators of Wood, including Thora Hird, Celia Imrie and Duncan Preston. First aired in 1994 on BBC One, the film was directed by Gavin Millar and produced by Ruth Caleb.

After gaining over 10 million viewers, it won a Broadcasting Press Guild award and was nominated for two BAFTA awards. It drew comparisons with northern English dramatist Alan Bennett for its complex characterisation and observational dialogue.

Plot

Margaret Mottershead works as a cook at a motorway service station. She joins her colleagues on a works outing to London to see a recording of Magic Moments, a Surprise, Surprise-style television series. Pat Bedford, the glamorous British star of an American soap, returns to the UK to promote her book on the show, unaware that the producers have planned to make her part of one of the surprises. During the show, Margaret is shocked to be invited onto the stage by the host Maeve and asked about her sister Patricia, whom she has not seen for 27 years. Backstage, Pat freezes in a panic when she hears the name "Patricia Theresa Mary Mottershead" and is invited on-stage to meet her long-lost sister Margaret. Attempting to remain professional, Pat embraces Margaret and feigns happiness. Afterwards, she tries to prevent the programme being broadcast, only to discover that it was live on air. The vain, beautiful Pat rejects Margaret, ashamed of her sister and fearing further damaging revelations about her past. Margaret prepares to leave, but the coach has left without her. Unaware of Pat's true feelings, her assistant Claire has arranged for Margaret to stay with Pat at her luxury hotel.

In the morning, a Magic Moments film crew arrives to follow the pair getting to know each other, and Pat resigns herself to staged bonding for the cameras. Margaret phones her boyfriend Jim to let him know where she is, but his disapproving mother does not pass on the message. Pat tries unsuccessfully to pay off an angry Margaret, who tells Pat she doesn't want anything from her. Once the newspaper articles come out, Margaret realizes that they have viciously misquoted her and her colleagues at the motorway service station and fears for her job. She stays though, when tabloid journalist Stella Kincaid, desperate for dirt on Pat, discovers a woman she thinks is Pat's mother Vera in a nursing home in Pat's home town. Pat and Margaret talk about how horrible their mother was and Margaret agrees to help Pat. The two head North, hoping to stop Vera talking to the press. In the car, Margaret shares a bit of her life. She mentions that she was once married and, soon after losing her husband, had a miscarriage.

Meanwhile, Stella digs up dirt on Pat by tracking down her old neighbours, discovering in the process that Pat had a child at the age of fifteen. She also hears insinuations that Vera had been a prostitute. The sisters find that the Vera in the nursing home is not their mother and continue on. Jim, believing Margaret has dumped him, has gone to London to find her. He meets Claire, and the two follow Pat and Margaret north. Stella, however, has managed to track the real Vera down, and after seeing photographs of her realizes she is linked to another storya timeshare scandal.

While hiding from Stella at a petrol station in the North, the glamorous Pat is accidentally hosed down with water by a power hose, leaving her soaking wet. This forces her to change out of her expensive clothes and expensive leather jacket. Having left all her luggage and credit cards and identification with Claire, Pat has to borrow money from Margaret to buy a cheap shellsuit at the petrol station. To add to her humiliation, Pat is unable to book into a hotel as, again, she has left all her credit cards and identification with Claire and the management state she isn't suitably dressed. Margaret asks her boss Bella to give Pat a bed for the night, but she is furious with Margaret over false claims in a newspaper article that Margaret is ditching her job and moving to Los Angeles.

Margaret takes Pat to her bedsit where the two argue about the different paths their lives have taken. Margaret reveals that Vera was sent to prison after Pat left and she ended up being fostered around, while Pat reveals that she was thrown out because she became pregnant. Jim arrives with Pat's bag, but when he proves more worried about leaving his mother alone than about meeting Pat, an irritated Margaret ends their relationship. Pat takes Margaret to the Swiss Cottage Café where she worked as a teenager, which is still owned by her old boss, now planning to retire. Claire joins them for dinner where she gives Pat "a note from a fan", actually given to Jim by Stella. The note appears to be from Vera, asking to meet, but in fact, has been written by Stella, who knows where Vera is living.

Pat and Margaret are stunned to find their mother had won the pools and has a large house. Vera assumes Margaret wants money; Pat angrily tells Vera she owes them, but Vera reminds Pat that there was nothing to stop her tracking Margaret down and giving her a better life, forcing Pat to admit she is hard and selfish like her mother. Vera claims she's what drove Pat to make a success of her life, and reveals she has to sell the house because of the timeshare scandal; at this point Stella appears with her photographer and Pat realizes she has been set up.

Stella reveals Vera has given her an exclusive and that she knows about the baby, threatening to trace Pat's child. However, Pat turns the tables by revealing he has already traced her many years before and has no interest in being involved with the media. Margaret angrily tells Stella that Pat should be applauded for beating the odds rather than derided in the press; Stella offers to make the story a sympathetic "rags to riches" tale if all three women give her an exclusive; the goal to create a TV mini-series of their story. Margaret suggests Meryl Streep should play her in the series.

Margaret and Jim make up their quarrel when he decides to leave his mother and move in with Margaret. At the airport, Pat fails to persuade Margaret to move to the United States with her, but, in a surprise move, takes Vera instead, telling her "they're very big at the moment, celebrities' mums", and giving Stella a happy ending for her story. Pat leaves Margaret a goodbye letter which has a set of keys with it; the final scene shows Margaret and Jim happily clearing up at the Swiss Cottage Café, which Pat has bought for her sister.

Cast
 Victoria Wood as Margaret Mottershead
 Julie Walters as Pat Bedford
 Celia Imrie as Claire
 Duncan Preston as Jim
 Deborah Grant as Stella
 Thora Hird as Jim's mother
 Shirley Stelfox as Vera Mottershead
 Anne Reid as Maeve
 Julie Hesmondhalgh as Carer
 Philip Lowrie as Martin
 Don Henderson as Billy
 Lynda Rooke as Bella
 Madge Hindle as Hotel Lady
 Robert Kingswell as Pete

Production
The film was created and written by Wood (whose last full-length drama was Happy Since I Met You in 1981), directed by Gavin Millar and produced by Ruth Caleb. An early draft of the script was rejected by LWT, who said "a film is not a sketch, you know".

Filming locations
 Motorway services – Heston services on the M4
 Peacock Productions studios – BBC Elstree Centre
 Sanctuary Spa, Covent Garden
 Margaret's flat – Grafton Road, Acton
 Jim's mother's house – 65 Oozehead Lane, Blackburn
 Pat and Margaret's childhood home – Woodlea Road, Blackburn
 Vera's house – Longacre, Billinge End Road, Blackburn

Reception
The film was watched by more than 10 million viewers.

After going on location during filming, James Rampton for The Independent wrote that the film "contains many lines of vintage Victoria...And – judging from the script – the film is not a three-minute idea tortuously spun out over 90, but a living, breathing feature, with characters rather than caricatures and pathos rather than punchlines." For Screenonline, Mark Duguid wrote the drama is Wood's "most ambitious, rounded and mature work to date" and describes it as "rapturously received". On Wood's comparisons with Alan Bennett, he says that she "certainly shares Bennett's gift for characterisation and his ear for comic but natural dialogue". The Daily Telegraph's Judith Woods described Victoria Wood: As Seen on TV, Dinnerladies and Acorn Antiques as "character-led television gems".

The film won the Broadcasting Press Guild Award for best single drama, and the best actress and best screenplay awards at the Reims Television Festival. The drama was also nominated for two British Academy Television Awards in 1994: best single drama, and best actress for Wood.

References

External links

1994 television films
1994 films
British television films
BBC television dramas
Films with screenplays by Victoria Wood
Films directed by Gavin Millar
1990s English-language films